Stars & Stripes is an EP that was recorded by the American reggae band SOJA and released in January 2008. It contains new songs, as well as reworked versions of three older songs.

Track listing 
 "Stars & Stripes"
 "To Whom It May Concern"
 "Bleed Through"
 "You Don't Know Me" (new version)
 "Revolution" (new version)
 "Be Aware" (R. Berty remix)

References

External links
SOJAmusic.com

SOJA albums
Reggae EPs
2008 EPs